Hallelesis asochis, the eastern hallelesis, is a butterfly in the family Nymphalidae. It is found in Nigeria, Cameroon, the Republic of the Congo, the Central African Republic, Angola and the Democratic Republic of the Congo. The habitat consists of swampy areas, usually in forests.

Subspecies
Hallelesis asochis asochis (Nigeria, Cameroon)
Hallelesis asochis congoensis (Joicey & Talbot, 1921) (southern Cameroon, Congo, Central African Republic, Angola, eastern Democratic Republic of the Congo)

References

Elymniini
Butterflies described in 1866
Butterflies of Africa
Taxa named by William Chapman Hewitson